Konstantīns Igošins (born 22 September 1971) is a retired Latvian professional footballer.

Career
He made his professional debut in the Soviet Second League in 1990 for FK Daugava Rīga.

He played for FC Lokomotiv Moscow in the USSR Federation Cup.

References

Russian footballers
Soviet footballers
Latvian footballers
Latvia international footballers
FC Lokomotiv Moscow players
FC Shinnik Yaroslavl players
FC Lada-Tolyatti players
FC Sibir Novosibirsk players
FC Irtysh Omsk players
1971 births
Living people
Latvian expatriate footballers
Expatriate footballers in Russia
Latvian expatriate sportspeople in Russia
Association football goalkeepers
FC Yenisey Krasnoyarsk players
FC Neftekhimik Nizhnekamsk players
FC Novokuznetsk players
FC FShM Torpedo Moscow players
FC Amur Blagoveshchensk players